The 1899 Southern Intercollegiate Athletic Association football season was the college football games played by the member schools of the Southern Intercollegiate Athletic Association as part of the 1899 college football season.

The season began on October 6, 1899 with Vanderbilt visiting Cumberland.

Sewanee won the conference with 11 conference victories. With just 13 players, the team known as the "Iron Men" had a six-day road trip with five shutout wins over Texas A&M; Texas; Tulane; LSU; and Ole Miss. Sportswriter Grantland Rice called the group "the most durable football team I ever saw." The road trip is recalled memorably with the Biblical allusion "...and on the seventh day they rested."

Season overview

Results and team statistics

Key

PPG = Average of points scored per game
PAG = Average of points allowed per game

Regular season

SIAA teams in bold.

Week One

Week Two

Week Three

Week Four

Week Five

Week Six

Week Seven

Week Eight

Week Nine

Week Ten

Week Twelve

All-Southern team

W. A. Lambeth's All-Southern team:

References